is a village located in Koyu District, Miyazaki Prefecture, Japan.

, the village has an estimated population of 1,013 and the density of 3.73 persons per km2. The total area is 271.51 km2.

Nishimera is made up of the hamlets of Murasho, Ogawa, Koshino, Yokono, Takehara, Kanmera, and Itaya.

The main hamlet of Nishimera is called Murasho, has a population of 639 and has one traffic light. However such isolation is balanced by the mountains which surround the village and the river which runs through it.

Geography

Climate
Nishimera has a humid subtropical climate (Köppen climate classification Cfa) with hot, humid summers and cool winters.

Demographics
Per Japanese census data, the population of Nishimera in 2020 is 1,000 people. Nishimera has been conducting censuses since 1920.

Twin towns – sister cities
Nishimera is twinned with:
  Kikuchi, Kumamoto, Japan
  Tōno, Iwate, Japan

Transportation

Highways 

 Higashikyushu Expressway
 Kyushu Expressway
 Japan National Route 219
 Japan National Route 265

References

External links

Nishimera official website 
 

Villages in Miyazaki Prefecture